Vince Griffiths (29 May 1901 – 7 January 1967) was a Welsh rugby union player who represented Wales and the British Lions. Griffiths played club rugby for Newport and captained the team in the 1928/29 season.

Griffiths gained his first cap for Wales in 1924 against Scotland at Inverleith. Wales were humiliated by Scotland, but Griffiths scored a try and regained his position to be chosen to face Ireland in the next match of the Five Nations Championship. Griffiths's last game for Wales was against Ireland, but was chosen to join the British Lions 1924 tour of South Africa; he played in six games, including two tests.

International matches played

Wales
  1924
  1924
  1924

British Lions
  1924, 1924

Bibliography

References

1901 births
1967 deaths
Rugby union players from Pontypridd
Alumni of the University of Bristol
Welsh rugby union players
Wales international rugby union players
Newport RFC players
Pontypool RFC players
British & Irish Lions rugby union players from Wales